Ike Abrams Quebec (August 17, 1918 – January 16, 1963) was an American jazz tenor saxophonist. He began his career in the big band era of the 1940s, then fell from prominence for a time until launching a comeback in the years before his death.

Critic Alex Henderson wrote, "Though he was never an innovator, Quebec had a big, breathy sound that was distinctive and easily recognizable, and he was quite consistent when it came to down-home blues, sexy ballads, and up-tempo aggression."

Biography
Quebec was born in Newark, New Jersey, United States. An accomplished dancer and pianist, he switched to tenor sax as his primary instrument in his early twenties, and quickly earned a reputation as a promising player. His recording career started in 1940, with the Barons of Rhythm.

Later on, he recorded or performed with Frankie Newton, Hot Lips Page, Roy Eldridge, Trummy Young, Ella Fitzgerald, Benny Carter and Coleman Hawkins. Between 1944 and 1951, he worked intermittently with Cab Calloway. He began to record for the Blue Note label in this era, and served as a talent scout (helping pianists Thelonious Monk and Bud Powell come to wider attention). Due to his exceptional sight reading skills, Quebec was also an uncredited impromptu arranger for many Blue Note sessions.

Due in part to struggles with heroin addiction (but also due to the fading popularity of the big bands), Quebec recorded only sporadically during the 1950s, although he still performed regularly. He kept abreast of new developments in jazz, and his later playing incorporated elements of hard bop, bossa nova, and soul jazz.

In 1959, he began what amounted to a comeback with a series of albums on the Blue Note label. Blue Note executive Alfred Lion was always fond of Quebec's music, but was unsure how audiences would respond to the saxophonist after a decade of low visibility. In the mid-to-late 1950s, Blue Note issued a series of Quebec singles for the juke box market; audiences responded well, leading to a number of warmly-received albums. Quebec occasionally recorded on piano, as on his 1961 Blue & Sentimental album, where he alternated between tenor and piano, playing the latter behind Grant Green's guitar solos.

Quebec's comeback was short-lived; it was ended by his death in January 1963, at the age of 44 from lung cancer. He is buried at Woodland Cemetery, Newark, New Jersey.

Family
Quebec's cousin Danny Quebec West was an alto saxophonist who, at the age of 17, recorded with Thelonious Monk on his first session for Blue Note in 1947.

Discography

As leader
 Ike Quebec Tenor Sax (Blue Note, 1945)
 From Hackensack to Englewood Cliffs (Blue Note, 1959 [rel. 2000])
 The Complete Blue Note 45 Sessions (Blue Note, 1959–1962 [rel. 2005]) 2-CD set; originally released on Mosaic Records in 1988; also contains 8 of the 10 tracks on From Hackensack to Englewood Cliffs.
 Heavy Soul (Blue Note 84093, 1961 [rel. 1962]) 
 It Might as Well Be Spring (Blue Note 84105, 1961 [rel. 1964])
 Blue & Sentimental (Blue Note 84098, 1961 [rel. 1963])
 Easy Living (Blue Note 84103 (LP), 1962; 46846 (CD), 1987) the CD issue contains all 5 "sextet" tracks that were first released on Congo Lament.
 Soul Samba (Blue Note 84114, 1962 [rel. 1963])
 With a Song in My Heart (Blue Note LT-1052 (LP), 1962 [rel. 1980]) collects 9 tracks that later appeared on The Complete Blue Note 45 Sessions.
 Congo Lament (Blue Note LT-1089 (LP), 1962 [rel. 1981]) sextet recordings with Bennie Green, Stanley Turrentine.
 The Art of Ike Quebec (Blue Note 99178 (CD), 1992) compilation
 Ballads (Blue Note 56690 (CD), 1997) compilation of 9 tracks from Easy Living, Born To Be Blue (Grant Green album), Heavy Soul, It Might As Well Be Spring, The Complete Blue Note 45 Sessions, With A Song In My Heart.

As sideman
with Cab Calloway And His Orchestra
 Live At The New Cafe Zanzibar 1944 (Magnetic Records) 
with Sonny Clark
 Leapin' and Lopin' (Blue Note, 1961) - on one track only
with Grant Green
 Born to Be Blue (Blue Note, 1962 [rel. 1985])
 The Latin Bit (Blue Note, 1962) - on two CD bonus tracks
with Dodo Greene
My Hour of Need (Blue Note, 1962 [rel. 1963])
With Jimmy Smith
Open House (Blue Note, 1960)
Plain Talk (Blue Note, 1960)

References

1918 births
1963 deaths
American jazz tenor saxophonists
American male saxophonists
Soul-jazz saxophonists
Jump blues musicians
Hard bop saxophonists
Blue Note Records artists
Deaths from lung cancer in New York (state)
Burials in New Jersey
20th-century American saxophonists
20th-century American male musicians
American male jazz musicians
The Cab Calloway Orchestra members